Same-sex marriage in France has been legal since 18 May 2013, making France the thirteenth country worldwide to allow same-sex couples to marry. The legislation applies to metropolitan France as well as to all French overseas departments and territories.

A bill granting same-sex couples the right to marry and jointly adopt children was introduced to the National Assembly by the Socialist Government of Prime Minister Jean-Marc Ayrault on 7 November 2012, with the support of President François Hollande who declared his intent to support the legislation during his campaign for the presidency. On 12 February 2013, the National Assembly approved the bill in a 329–229 vote. On 12 April 2013, the Senate approved the bill with amendments in a 171–165 vote, followed by the approval of the amended bill by the National Assembly on 23 April 2013 in a 331–225 vote. However, a challenge to the law by the conservative Union for a Popular Movement party was filed with the Constitutional Council following the vote. On 17 May 2013, the Council ruled that the law was constitutional. That same day, President Hollande promulgated the bill, which was officially published the next day in the Journal Officiel de la République Française. The first official same-sex marriage ceremony took place on 29 May 2013 in the city of Montpellier.

History

Despite the creation and implementation in 1999 of the civil solidarity pact, more commonly known as PACS, a system allowing civil partnerships between two persons without regard to their gender and guaranteeing certain personal and civil rights to both "pacsés", there was considerable political and societal debate over same-sex marriage in France during the first decade of the 21st century.

2004 same-sex marriage
On 5 June 2004, former Green Party presidential candidate Noël Mamère, mayor of the Bordeaux suburb of Bègles, conducted a same-sex marriage ceremony for two men, Bertrand Charpentier and Stéphane Chapin. Mamère claimed that there was nothing in French law to prohibit such a ceremony, and that he would appeal any challenge to the European Court of Human Rights.

Minister of Justice Dominique Perben had stated that such unions would be legally void, and called for judicial intervention to halt the ceremony. On 27 July 2004, the Bordeaux Court of General Jurisdiction declared the marriage null and void. One legal argument defended by the public prosecutor, representing the national government, was that the French Civil Code contained several mentions of husband and wife, thereby implying different genders. On 19 April 2005, the Appeals Court of Bordeaux upheld the ruling, and on 14 March 2007, the Court of Cassation turned down Charpentier and Chapin's appeal. On 9 June 2016, the European Court of Human Rights ruled that the decision to invalidate Charpentier and Chapin's marriage did not constitute an infringement of the European Convention on Human Rights.

Reaction
Shortly after the ceremony took place, Interior Minister Dominique de Villepin instituted disciplinary procedures against Mayor Mamère, suspending him from his duties for one month. The local administrative court ruled that Mamère's suspension was legal and substantiated. Mamère said he would not appeal the ruling, having already unsuccessfully attempted to get an injunction from the court, then appealing the case to the Council of State; both had ruled that an injunction was not justified on grounds of urgency.

On 11 May 2004, Socialist Party leader François Hollande announced that he would ask his party to file a draft law making same-sex marriages unequivocally legal. Some other party leaders, such as former Prime Minister Lionel Jospin, publicly disapproved of same-sex marriage. Hollande's partner, Ségolène Royal, said at the time that she harbored doubts about same-sex marriage, though now fully supports it.

2006 parliamentary report
A parliamentary "Report on the Family and the Rights of Children" was released on 25 January 2006. Although the committee recommended increasing some of the rights already granted by the PACS civil partnership, it recommended maintaining prohibitions against marriage, adoption, and access to medically assisted reproduction for same-sex couples, arguing that these three issues were inseparable and that allowing them would contravene a number of articles of the United Nations Convention on the Rights of the Child, to which France is a signatory (though many UN member nations did grant some or all of these rights to same-sex couples). Referring to the rights of children as a human rights issue, the report argued that children "now have rights, and to systematically give preference to adult aspirations over respect for these rights is not possible anymore." Because of these prohibitions, left-wing members of the committee rejected the report.

2011 Constitutional Council decision
LGBT organizations in France, believing that the prohibition of same-sex marriage was contrary to the Constitution of France, asked the Constitutional Council to examine the constitutionality of same-sex marriage and to review the articles of the Civil Code. On 28 January 2011, the Council decided that the illegality of same-sex marriages was not contrary to the Constitution, further stating that same-sex marriage legalization was a question for Parliament to decide.

2011 bill

On 14 June 2011, the National Assembly of France voted 293–222 against legalizing same-sex marriage. Deputies of the governing Union for a Popular Movement party mostly voted against the measure, while deputies of the Socialist Party mostly voted in favour. Members of the Socialist Party said that the legalization of same-sex marriage would become a priority should they gain a majority in the 2012 legislative election.

Cabestany's 2011 same-sex marriage
On 12 November 2011, Mayor Jean Vila of Cabestany performed a same-sex wedding ceremony for a couple named Patrick, 48, and Guillaume, 37. The marriage was not recorded in order to prevent a subsequent nullification, and Vila described it as a "militant act", saying that "there are times when it is necessary to act outside the law. Refusing same-sex marriage is to deny the reality of thousands of couples." The French Government's reaction was mixed: the Secretary of State for Family, Claude Greff, called the event a "provocation on the eve of the presidential election", while Minister of Solidarity and Social Cohesion Roselyne Bachelot said she supported same-sex marriage but that the ceremony was "not the best way to advance the cause".

2012–2013 bill

During his campaign for the 2012 presidential election, Socialist Party candidate François Hollande declared his support for same-sex marriage and adoption by same-sex couples, including them as one of his campaign's 60 government commitments. On 6 May 2012, Hollande won the election and promised to pass same-sex marriage legislation before the spring of 2013. On 17 June, Hollande's party won an absolute majority in the National Assembly, followed by an announcement by government spokesperson Najat Vallaud-Belkacem that a same-sex marriage bill would be adopted in spring 2013 at the latest. On 3 July, in his first speech in front of the newly elected assembly, Prime Minister Jean-Marc Ayrault announced that marriage and adoption for all couples would be a reality "in the first semester of 2013". The draft bill was submitted to the French Parliament on 7 November 2012.

On 2 February 2013, the National Assembly approved the first article of the same-sex marriage bill by 249 votes to 97; the debate took several days as opponents introduced more than 5,000 amendments to the bill in order to slow down its passage. On 12 February, the National Assembly approved the bill as a whole in a 329–229 vote and sent it to the Senate.

The Senate started debating the bill on 4 April 2013 and five days later approved its first article in a 179–157 vote. On 12 April, the Senate approved the bill with minor amendments in a 171–165 vote. The Senate version of the marriage bill was adopted by the National Assembly on 23 April 2013 in a 331–225 vote.

The opposition Union for a Popular Movement (UMP) party immediately filed a challenge against the law with the Constitutional Council. On 17 May 2013, the Council declared the law constitutional. The same day, President François Hollande promulgated the bill, which was officially published on 18 May 2013 in the Journal Officiel de la République Française. The first official same-sex wedding ceremony took place on 29 May in the city of Montpellier between Vincent Autin and Bruno Boileau. The ceremony was conducted by Mayor Hélène Mandroux.

The same-sex marriage law is commonly referred to in France as la loi Taubira ("the Taubira law") in reference to Justice Minister Christiane Taubira who introduced the bill to the French Assembly in November 2012 and was the bill's main sponsor. The law amended Article 143 (Book I, Title V, Chapter I) of the Napoleonic Code to state that "marriage is contracted by two persons of different or of the same sex."

In June 2013, the French Government issued a circulaire "relating to the consequences of illegally refusing to celebrate a marriage on the part of a civil registrar". The circulaire stipulates a punishment of 5 years' imprisonment and a fine of 75,000€ for any mayor or local official who refuses to perform a marriage for a same-sex couple on the sole basis of their sexual orientation. The official may also face discrimination charges under Article 432-7 of the Penal Code. 146 mayors unsuccessfully challenged the circulaire in French courts. In October 2018, the European Court of Human Rights dismissed an appeal in the case.

There has been little political movement to abrogate the same-sex marriage law despite some politicians, including 2017 presidential candidate Marine Le Pen, expressly calling for its repeal. Former President Nicolas Sarkozy said he favored repealing the law in 2014, but said in a 2016 interview that he had changed his mind, calling a repeal "unjust, cruel and legally impossible". In 2017, the party president of The Republicans (previously the UMP), Laurent Wauquiez, said he opposed repealing the law. In June 2019, the vice president of the National Rally, Jordan Bardella, said the matter was "settled". While running in the 2022 presidential election, Le Pen said she opposed repealing the law, tweeting on 15 April 2022, "I will not take rights away from French citizens. Marriage for all will remain if I am elected President of the French Republic".

Scope
There had been initial confusion over whether the act applied to nationals of Algeria, Bosnia and Herzegovina, Cambodia, Kosovo, Laos, Montenegro, Morocco, Poland, Serbia, Slovenia or Tunisia, as it breached bilateral agreements stipulating that the law of those countries applies rather than French law. The Court of Cassation ruled that it does in September 2015, finding the provisions excluding these countries discriminatory and contrary to French law.

Polynesian third gender people
In Wallis and Futuna and the Society Islands of French Polynesia, there exists third gender people who occupy traditional spiritual and social roles. They are known as māhū in Tahitian. The māhū are assigned male at birth but express themselves as women. "Being outside of the traditional male-female divide", they are raised as girls from early childhood, carry out women's work in the home and the community, and historically often served as domestic servants of the nobility. The māhū are considered an integral part of Tahitian society. They have been known to Europeans since the 18th century, with William Bligh, the captain of HMS Bounty, having noted the presence of "men with great marks of effeminacy". If they wish to marry and have children, they will marry women. The māhū status thus creates the possibility for marriages between two female-presenting individuals to be performed in Tahitian culture. Assigned male at birth, they express themselves as women and carry out women's work in the community.

Marriage statistics
In 2013, following the introduction of same-sex marriage in France, approximately 7,000 same-sex couples were legally married in the country. They made up approximately 3% of all marriages in that time, with three out of every five same-sex marriages involving male couples. Approximately 10,500 same-sex marriages took place in France in 2014, representing 4% of all marriages performed that year. Male couples accounted for about 54% of these marriages, while lesbian couples accounted for the remaining 46%. Some 6,000 French communes performed at least one same-sex marriage. 1,331 same-sex couples married in the French capital of Paris, comprising 13.5% of the total number of weddings performed in the city.

From May 2013 to December 2016, approximately 32,640 same-sex marriages were performed in France.

By 23 April 2018, five years after the French Parliament had approved the same-sex marriage law, approximately 40,000 same-sex couples had married in the country. This represented about 3.5% of all marriages performed during that time. The departments with the highest share of same-sex marriages were Paris (9.7%), Calvados (5.6%), Charente-Maritime (5.4%), Hérault (5.1%), Orne (4.8%), Alpes-de-Haute-Provence (4.6%), Alpes-Maritimes (4.5%) and Lot (4.4%) whereas the departments with the lowest shares were Guadeloupe (0.3%), Mayotte (0.6%), Martinique (0.6%), French Guiana (1%), Haute-Corse (1.1%), Réunion (1.2%), Ariège (1.5%) and Corse-du-Sud (1.6%).

Overseas departments and territories

A lesbian couple, Rosemonde Zébo and Myriam Jourdan, became the first same-sex couple to marry in Martinique in June 2013. The couple were married in Le Carbet in a ceremony alongside family, friends and well-wishers. The first same-sex wedding in Guadeloupe occurred in July 2013 in Saint-Anne between Eric Dandler and Serge Willame. The first same-sex marriage in French Guiana took place in August 2013 in the city of Saint-Laurent-du-Maroni, and by April 2018 12 same-sex couples had married in the capital city of Cayenne.

In Réunion, the first same-sex marriage was performed for a lesbian couple, Laurence Serveaux and Corinne Denis, in Saint-Paul in June 2013. By July 2015, 93 same-sex couples had married on the island. In Mayotte, the first same-sex wedding was performed in September 2013 for a French-Cuban couple in Mamoudzou. The marriage was performed by Mayor Abdourahamane Soilihi, a vocal opponent of same-sex marriage. This marked the first time in modern history that a legally recognized same-sex marriage occurred in a jurisdiction where a majority of the population follows the religion of Islam. The first marriage between a male Maorais couple was performed in March 2015. In 2022, a couple from the town of Kani-Kéli were denied the right to marry on multiple occasions. The couple were initially scheduled to get married on 12 February after months of planning, but the mayor later postponed the ceremony to 14 February, before postponing it again onto several successive dates. The couple alleges that the mayor is "scared" of performing the marriage in the face of public opposition, and have filed charges against him in court.

The first same-sex marriage in French Polynesia took place in Haapiti, Mo'orea in July 2013. The couple who had wished for a quiet ceremony were harassed by a group of opponents of same-sex marriage. By February 2014, 11 same-sex marriages had occurred in New Caledonia, representing 1.7% of all marriages, with 9 of these being performed in the South Province and the remaining 2 in the North Province. The first same-sex marriage in the North Province was performed in Poindimié in September 2013. The same-sex marriage law does not apply to individuals governed under Kanak customary law, which recognises Kanak customs for contracts, land, family and persons. If a Kanak same-sex couple wishes to marry, they would need to renounce their customary law status and ask to be governed under French civil law.

The first male couple to marry in Saint Barthélemy did so in August 2013 in Gustavia. In Saint Martin, the first same-sex marriage was performed in October 2013 and officiated by politician Guillaume Arnell. The couple had rocks thrown at them and received homophobic insults as they left city hall. The first same-sex marriage in Saint Pierre and Miquelon occurred in March 2014.

Overall, relatively few same-sex marriages have been performed in the overseas departments and territories compared to metropolitan France. According to a 2018 report, eight same-sex marriages had been performed in Saint Barthélemy, five in French Polynesia, four in Saint Martin, two in Saint Pierre and Miquelon and one in Wallis and Futuna since legalization.

Religious performance
In May 2015, the United Protestant Church of France voted to allow its pastors to bless same-sex marriages. The measure, which was passed by 94 votes to 3, also includes a freedom of conscience clause allowing pastors with objections to opt out. A marriage between two lesbian pastors was celebrated in the church in Montpellier in July 2021.

The assembly of the Union of Protestant Churches of Alsace and Lorraine voted in November 2019 by 36 votes to 13 to allow its pastors to bless same-sex marriages. The measure also includes a freedom of conscience clause for pastors opposed to blessing same-sex relationships.

Public opinion
Opinion polls show that the French public supports the legalization of same-sex marriage, with that support gradually increasing over time:

A 1996 Ifop poll found that 48% of respondents supported same-sex marriage, with 33% opposed.
A 2003 Gallup poll found that 58% of respondents supported same-sex marriage.
A May 2004 Ipsos poll found that 57% of respondents supported same-sex marriage, with 38% opposed. Younger people were particularly in favour, with 75% of those under 35 in support. Nevertheless, only 40% were in favour of same-sex adoption rights, though 56% of those younger than 35 were in support.
A 2004 Ifop poll showed that 64% of respondents were in support of same-sex marriage, with 49% supporting adoption rights.
A 2006 Eurobarometer survey found that 48% of respondents supported same-sex marriage being allowed "throughout Europe". This was 4% above the EU average. Support for adoption rights was at 35%, 3% above the EU average.
A 2006 Ipsos poll found that 61% of respondents favoured the recognition of civil marriage for same-sex couples.
A June 2006 Taylor Nelson Sofres poll found that 45% of respondents supported same-sex marriage, with 51% opposed. 36% supported adoption rights for same-sex couples.
A June 2008 Ifop poll put support for same-sex marriage in France at 62%, with 38% in opposition. 51% supported adoption rights. Support for same-sex marriage was very high among younger people, with 77% of those aged between 25 and 34 in favour.
A November 2009 BVA Group poll showed that 64% of respondents were in favour of same-sex marriage, including for the first time a majority of right-wing voters. 57% supported adoption rights (support was 68% among those between 18 and 25 years old).
A July 2010 poll from Crédoc (Centre de recherche pour l'étude et l'observation des conditions de vie) showed that 61% of respondents were in favour of same-sex marriage, and 48% supported adoption rights.
A January 2011 Taylor Nelson Sofres poll found that 58% of respondents supported same-sex marriage, with 35% opposed. Support was 74% among those under the age of 35. 49% supported adoption rights for same-sex couples.
 A June 2011 Ifop poll found that 63% of respondents were in favour of same-sex marriage, and 58% supported adoption rights for same-sex couples.
 A December 2011 BVA Group poll found that 63% of respondents were in favour of same-sex marriage, and 56% supported adoption rights for same-sex couples.
 An August 2012 Ifop poll found that 65% of respondents were in favour of same-sex marriage, and 53% supported adoption rights for same-sex couples.
 An October 2012 Ifop poll found that 61% of respondents were in favour of same-sex marriage, and 48% supported adoption rights for same-sex couples.
 An October 2012 BVA Group poll found that 58% of respondents were in favour of same-sex marriage, and 50% supported adoption rights for same-sex couples.
 A December 2012 CSA Institute poll found that 54% of respondents were in favour of same-sex marriage, and 48% supported adoption rights for same-sex couples.
 A December 2012 Ifop poll found that 60% of respondents were in favour of same-sex marriage, and 46% supported adoption rights for same-sex couples.
 A December 2012–January 2013 YouGov poll found that 47% of respondents were in favour of same-sex marriage, and 38% supported adoption rights for same-sex couples.
 A January 2013 Ifop poll found that 60% of respondents were in favour of same-sex marriage, and 46% supported adoption rights for same-sex couples.
 A January 2013 OpinionWay poll found that 57% of respondents were in favour of same-sex marriage, and 45% supported adoption rights for same-sex couples.
 A January 2013 Ifop poll found that 63% of respondents were in favour of same-sex marriage, and 49% supported adoption rights for same-sex couples.
 A February 2013 Ifop poll found that 66% of respondents were in favour of same-sex marriage, and 47% supported adoption rights for same-sex couples.
 An April 2013 BVA Group poll found that 58% of respondents were in favour of same-sex marriage, and 47% supported adoption rights for same-sex couples.
 An April 2013 Ifop/Atlantico poll found that 51% of respondents were in favour of same-sex marriage and adoption rights for same-sex couples.
 An April 2013 Ifop poll found that 53% of respondents were in favour of the new law allowing same-sex marriage and adoption rights.
 A May 2013 Ipsos poll found that 51% of respondents were in favour of same-sex marriage and another 29% supported other forms of recognition for same-sex couples.
 A May 2013 Ifop poll found that 52% of respondents were in favour of same-sex marriage and adoption rights for same-sex couples.
 A May 2013 Ifop/Atlantico poll found that 53% of respondents were in favour of same-sex marriage and adoption rights for same-sex couples.
 A February 2014 BVA Group poll found that 61% of respondents were in favour of same-sex marriage and 50% were in favour of adoption rights for same-sex couples.
 An April 2014 BVA Group poll found that 55% of respondents were in favour of same-sex marriage and 48% were in favour of adoption rights for same-sex couples.
 A September 2014 iTélé poll showed that 73% of respondents including 56% of those who support the Union for a Popular Movement would oppose the repeal of same-sex marriage.
 A September–October 2014 Ifop poll showed that 57% of respondents were against repealing the law allowing same-sex couples to marry and adopt children.
 A November 2014 Ifop/Atlantico poll found that 68% of respondents were in favour of same-sex marriage and 53% supported adoption rights for same-sex couples.
 A May–June 2015 Eurobarometer survey found that 71% of French people thought same-sex marriage should be allowed throughout Europe, while 24% were opposed.
 A June 2015 BVA Group poll found that 67% of respondents were in favour of same-sex marriage, 64% were against revising the 2013 law and 57% were in favour of adoption rights for same-sex couples.
 An August 2016 Ifop poll for the Association of Homosexual Families (ADFH) found that 65% of respondents opposed repealing the 2013 same-sex marriage law.
 A Pew Research Center poll, conducted between April and August 2017 and published in May 2018, showed that 73% of French people supported same-sex marriage, 23% were opposed and 4% did not know or refused to answer. When divided by religion, 85% of religiously unaffiliated people, 78% of non-practicing Christians and 59% of church-attending Christians supported same-sex marriage. Opposition to same-sex marriage was 17% among 18–34-year-olds.
 The 2019 Eurobarometer found that 79% of French people thought same-sex marriage should be allowed throughout Europe, while 15% were opposed. The EU average was 69%.

See also
Civil solidarity pact
LGBT rights in France
La Manif pour tous
Recognition of same-sex unions in Europe

Notes

References

External links

 Loi no 2013-404 du 17 mai 2013 ouvrant le mariage aux couples de personnes de même sexe, Légifrance (in French)
 History of same-sex marriage in France, Government of France (in French)

 
2013 in LGBT history